13th Street was an Australian television channel which specialised in airing action and suspense programmes. The channel was owned by NBC Universal and was launched on 15 November 2009 as part of Foxtel's Next Generation launch. It launched on Fetch TV in 2017 as part of Fetch TV's channel pack revamp.

The same business that runs 13th Street in other nations also owned 13th Street in Australia. It was the first 13th Street to use the new logo, which Universal Networks International debuted at MIPCOM in October 2009

On 3 November 2014, 13th Street launched a HD simulcast on Foxtel. In addition, it moved from channel 113 to channel 118 and 13th Street + 2 moved from channel 163 to channel 160. It launched on channel 110 on the IPTV service Fetch TV in 2017. It ceased broadcasting on 31 December 2019, alongside sister channel Syfy. It was replaced by Fox Sleuth.

Programming
Programming on 13th Street was a mix of Australian, British, American and Canadian murder mysteries and crime dramas. The channel featured television series, mini-series and movies. Some of its programming was moved from sister channel Universal Channel when 13th Street launched (largely murder mystery style programs), however a larger range of premieres launched on 13th Street .

Final programming

 Above Suspicion
 Accused
 Amber
 The Bletchley Circle
 The Body Farm
 Case Histories
 City Homicide
 Columbo
 The Commander
 Criminal Justice
 Da Vinci's Inquest
 DNA
 Identity
 In Plain Sight
 The Inspector Lynley Mysteries
 Jack Taylor
 Jonathan Creek
 The Jury
 King
 Law & Order: UK (seasons 1-3 only, seasons 4-5 shown on Universal Channel)
 Line of Duty
 Marple
 Memphis Beat
 Messiah
 Miss Fisher's Murder Mysteries
 Monk
 Mr & Mrs Murder
 The Mrs Bradley Mysteries
 Murder, She Wrote 
 Murdoch Mysteries
 Poirot
 Republic of Doyle
 Restless
 Ripper Street
 Rosemary and Thyme
 The Runaway
 The Silence
 Single-Handed
 Taggart
 Trial & Retribution
 Vera
 Wire in the Blood

Former programming

 Close to Home
 Flashpoint (moved to Universal Channel)
 The Gil Mayo Mysteries
 Halifax f.p.
 Haven (moved to Syfy)
 Heartbeat
 Inspector Morse
 The Last Detective
 Life
 Maigret
 Murphy's Law
 Pie in the Sky

Ratings
Since its launch, 13th Street has dramatically increased its ratings to become one of the most watched subscription channels in Australia. Shortly after its November 2009 launch, it received a 0.6% share in the week beginning 29 November. By the end of December, ratings tripled to a 1.8% share.

References

External links
13th Street 

NBCUniversal networks
Television networks in Australia
Defunct television channels in Australia
Television channels and stations established in 2009
Television channels and stations disestablished in 2019
English-language television stations in Australia